Hughes Airport  is a state-owned public-use airport located one nautical mile (1.85 km) southwest of the central business district of Hughes, a city in the Yukon-Koyukuk Census Area of the U.S. state of Alaska.

As per Federal Aviation Administration records, this airport had 1,148 passenger boardings (enplanements) in calendar year 2007, an increase of 1% from the 1,137 enplanements in 2006.

Facilities and aircraft 
Hughes Airport has one runway (17/25) with a gravel surface measuring 3,380 by 100 feet (1,030 x 30 m). For the 12-month period ending December 31, 2005, the airport had 1,480 aircraft operations, an average of 123 per month: 74% air taxi, 25% general aviation and 1% military.

Airlines and destinations 

The following airlines offer scheduled passenger service at this airport:

References

External links 
 FAA Alaska airport diagram (GIF)

Airports in the Yukon–Koyukuk Census Area, Alaska